Stenoscinis is a genus of frit flies in the family Chloropidae. There are at least 2 described species in Stenoscinis.

Species
 Stenoscinis adachiae Sabrosky, 1961
 Stenoscinis longipes (Loew, 1863)

References

Further reading

External links

 Diptera.info

Oscinellinae